Brachystegia angustistipulata is a species of plant in the family Fabaceae. It is found in Democratic Republic of the Congo and Tanzania.

References

angustistipulata
Flora of the Democratic Republic of the Congo
Flora of Tanzania
Miombo
Trees of Africa
Least concern plants
Least concern biota of Africa
Taxonomy articles created by Polbot
Taxa named by Émile Auguste Joseph De Wildeman